covers most of the Shiretoko Peninsula at the northeastern tip of the island of Hokkaidō, Japan. The word "Shiretoko" is derived from an Ainu word "sir etok", meaning "the place where the earth protrudes".

One of the most remote regions in Japan, much of the peninsula is only accessible on foot or by boat. Shiretoko is best known as the home of Japan's largest population of brown bears, and for offering views of Kunashiri Island, ownership of which Japan and Russia dispute. Shiretoko is also the home of many birds, such as Steller's sea eagle and white-tailed eagle, and marine animals such as spotted seal, orca whale, and sperm whale.  The park has a hot springs waterfall called . Kamui wakka means "water of the gods" in Ainu.

The forests of the park are temperate and subalpine mixed forests; the main tree species include Sakhalin fir (Abies sachalinensis), Erman's birch (Betula ermanii) and Mongolian oak (Quercus mongolica). Beyond the forest limit there are impenetrable Siberian dwarf pine (Pinus pumila) thickets.

In 2005, UNESCO designated the area a World Heritage Site, advising to develop the property jointly with the Kuril Islands of Russia as a transboundary "World Heritage Peace Park". Shiretoko's listing as Natural Heritage was seen by the Indigenous Ainu as contradicting the long history of Ainu settlement in the park area.

The Shiretoko Park Nature Center is in Shari. It serves as the visitor center and includes a movie about the park, a restaurant, and a gift shop.

Features
 Mount Rausu

See also
 List of national parks of Japan
 List of World Heritage Sites in Japan
 Tourism in Japan

References

External links
 https://web.archive.org/web/20120716190831/http://www.biodic.go.jp/english/jpark/np/siretoko_e.html
 Shiretoko Park Nature Center
 

National parks of Japan
World Heritage Sites in Japan
Parks and gardens in Hokkaido
Protected areas established in 1964